The following are the national records in track cycling in Australia maintained by Australia's national cycling federation: Cycling Australia.

Men
Key to tables:

Women

References
General
Australian Cycling Records – Men 21 October 2022 updated
Australian Cycling Records – Women 27 August 2022 updated
Specific

External links
Cycling Australia web site

Australia
Track cycling
Records
track cycling